Rostislav Marosz (born 23 February 1991) is a Czech professional ice hockey player currently playing for HC Bílí Tygři Liberec of the Czech Extraliga.

Marosz has previously played with HC Oceláři Třinec, HC Olomouc, HC Energie Karlovy Vary and HC Dynamo Pardubice. He also played in the Slovak Extraliga for HK Dukla Trenčín.

References

External links 
 
 

1991 births
Living people
Czech ice hockey forwards
HK Dukla Trenčín players
HC Dynamo Pardubice players
AZ Havířov players
HC Karlovy Vary players
HC Oceláři Třinec players
HC Olomouc players
Sportspeople from Třinec
SK Horácká Slavia Třebíč players
Stadion Hradec Králové players
Czech expatriate ice hockey players in Slovakia